Fernando Luis García (October 14, 1929 – September 5, 1952) was a United States Marine Corps private first class who was killed in action during the Korean War and posthumously  awarded the Medal of Honor for heroism above and beyond the call of duty on September 5, 1952, during the Battle of Bunker Hill (1952). He was the first of nine Puerto Rican servicemen to be awarded the Medal of Honor and is the only Puerto Rican Marine to be awarded the medal.

Biography
García (birth name: Fernando Luis García Ledesma ) was born in Utuado, Puerto Rico where he received his primary and secondary education. He moved to San Juan where he was hired by the Texas Company as a file clerk.

U.S. Marine Corps

Korean War 
On September 19, 1951, García joined the United States Marines Corps and received his recruit training at Parris Island, South Carolina. After he graduated from "boot camp", he was promoted to private first class in December and was sent to Camp Lejeune, North Carolina for more training before being sent to Korea in March 1952.

García was a member of Company I, 3rd Battalion, 5th Marines, 1st Marine Division. Chinese soldiers were attacking with artillery, mortars, and grenades. García was wounded and getting hand grenades from his acting platoon sergeant when an enemy grenade landed near them. García covered the grenade with his body, sacrificing himself to save the life of his fellow Marine who was wounded by the blast. García died instantly. For this heroic action, he was posthumously awarded the Medal of Honor.

García's remains were never recovered.

Medal of Honor citation
On October 25, 1953, García's parents were presented his Medal of Honor at a ceremony held in the Utuado City Hall.

Awards and decorations

Legacy

 There is a headstone with García's name in the Puerto Rico National Cemetery in the city of Bayamón, Puerto Rico.
On February 5, 1959, the United States Marines Corps named a military camp in Vieques, Puerto Rico, "Camp García" in his honor.
The United States Navy named the García class of ships in his honor, with the lead ship in the class bearing his name, as well.
His name is inscribed in "El Monumento de la Recordación" (Monument of Remembrance), dedicated to Puerto Rico's fallen soldiers and situated in front of the Capitol Building in San Juan, Puerto Rico.
His name is also inscribed in the "Wall of the Missing" located in the National Memorial of the Pacific in Honolulu, Hawaii, which honors the Medal of Honor recipients whose bodies have never been recovered. 
A monument commemorating his actions stands in his hometown of Utuado, Puerto Rico.
On November 11, 2008, the Government of Puerto Rico unveiled in the Capitol Rotunda the oil portrait of PFC Fernando Luis García.
The American Legion Post 42 in Utuado, Puerto Rico was named American Legion Auxiliary, 42 Pfc Fernando Luis Garcia and a low income housing project, the Caserío Fernando Luis García in Utuado, is also named after García.

See also

List of Puerto Rican military personnel
List of Medal of Honor recipients
List of Korean War Medal of Honor recipients
Puerto Rican recipients of the Medal of Honor
Hispanics in the United States Marine Corps

Notes

References

Further reading
Puertorriquenos Who Served With Guts, Glory, and Honor. Fighting to Defend a Nation Not Completely Their Own; by : Greg Boudonck; 

1929 births
1952 deaths
People from Utuado, Puerto Rico
United States Marine Corps Medal of Honor recipients
Puerto Rican recipients of the Medal of Honor
Puerto Rican United States Marines
United States Marines
American military personnel killed in the Korean War
Korean War recipients of the Medal of Honor
Deaths by hand grenade
United States Marine Corps personnel of the Korean War